Topless Women Talk About Their Lives is the soundtrack to the New Zealand film, Topless Women Talk About Their Lives.  It was released alongside the film by Flying Nun Records.

Track listing
"Hey Seuss" - The 3Ds
"North by North" - The Bats
"Anything Could Happen - The Clean
"Animal" - The 3DsSaskatchewan" - Superette
"Buddy" - Snapper
"I Love My Leather Jacket" - The Chills
"Down in Splendour" - Straitjacket Fits
"Point That Thing Somewhere Else" - The Clean
"Waves" - Superette
'She Speeds" - Straitjacket Fits
"Fish" - The Clean
"Spooky" - The 3Ds
"Not Given Lightly" - Chris Knox

Compilation albums by New Zealand artists
Film soundtracks
2006 soundtrack albums
Flying Nun Records compilation albums
2006 compilation albums
Flying Nun Records soundtracks
Dunedin Sound albums